Syed Ali Ausat Zaidi (Urdu: سيد علي اوسط زيدي) was a renowned Urdu Soazkhawan. He was born in Meerut in the northern Indian state of Uttar Pradesh in 1932 and died in Karachi, Pakistan in 2008. He hold the prestigious and eminent position of Soazkhawan for presenting soaz, salam and marsiya on Pakistan Television, Radio Pakistan, ARY Television Network, GEO TV, Indus TV and TV2Day for several years.

Life
He was the eldest son of Syed Bashir Ahmed Zaidi, a religious, pious and a noble person from Meerut. He got his basic education from his father who taught him and took personal interest in the education and upbringing of his son. He did his matriculation from Meerut, 'Faiz-e-Aam' high school in mid 1940s. He got his basic and advance religious studies in 'Mansabia' a center of excellence for shi'a community of Meerut. He learned and grasped different styles and skills of reciting Soaz, Marsiya and Noha from his maternal grandfather Syed Mohammad Jan who was also a famous and well-known Soazkhawan of his era.

Work, contribution and legacy
Syed Ali Ausat Zaidi had started reciting soaz, salam and marsiya quite early in his life with his maternal grandfather when he was just 10 years old though he perfected his art under supervision of his maternal grandfather and afterward he started reciting soaz, salam and marsiya independently in majalis at Meerut. He was also a Sahib-e-Biaz (Lead narrator) of a well recognised Anjuman (mourning organisation) of Meerut before partition.
After partition Syed Ali Ausat Zaidi migrated to Pakistan on 18 February 1948 and settled in Karachi where he found his old friends and he began a new journey by founding a 'Maatami Anjuman Nauhakhawani and Maatamdaari' kept growing in Karachi and around 25 years Ali Ausat Zaidi served as a Nohakhawan.
Allama Rasheed Turabi Qibla often used to quote the starting lines of a Noha recited by Syed Ali Ausat Zaidi saying:
Jab Kabhi Ghairat-e-Insaan ka sawal ata hai
Bint-e-Zehra teray Parday ka Khayaal ata hai
In Urdu,

جب کبھي غيرت ِ انساں کا سوال آتا ھے

بنت ِ زھرا تيرے پردے کا خيال آتا ھے

Peoples from ‘Maatami Dasta’ of Syed Ali Ausat Zaidi are still serving in Bargah-e-Imam-e-Aali Maqaam, being a part of Anjuman-e-Shabaab-ul-Momineen.

Trivia
In 1958, Syed Ali Naqvi Sahab asked Syed Ali Ausat Zaidi to recite Marsiya, Soaz O Salam in majlis of 21st Ramazan. At first, Syed Ali Ausat Zaidi hesitated but then accepted his offer. This was the first time he recited marsiya independently in a majlis. His effort was very fruitful. Allama Rasheed Turabi admired his style of delivering Salam O Marsiya so much that he invited him for Soazkhawani at Majlis-e-Soazkhawani, 19th Safar at Azakhana-e-Zehra.
This Majlis-e-Soazkhawani was started and organised by Allama Rasheed Turabi Sahib himself. In this majlis, leading Soazkhawans gifted Hadiya's of there Soaz O Salam to Imam Hussain (A.S). Syed Ali Ausat Zaidi as offered by Turabi Sahab attended this majlis and recited a Salam of 'Sajjad Razmi' Sahab which was liked by audience. Allama Rasheed Turabi Sahab encouraged Syed Ali Ausat Zaidi and said:

“Ausat Mian, Iss Saal ki Majlis Tu Tum Nay Loot Li”

In Urdu,

اوسط مياں ، ا س سال کي مجلس تو تم نے لوٹ لي

In this way Ali Ausat Sahab, started being recognised and known as a Soazkhawan in Karachi.

See also
 Soz
 Marsiya
 Noha

Legendary marsiyas
Some Syed Ali Ausat Zaidi's memorable and renowned collection of marsiyas are:

• Safar say jab kay na Shabbir ki Khabar aye سفر سےجبکہ نہ شبير کي خبر آئي

• Qareeb-e-Kufa tu Randoon ka karwan ayaa    قرب ِ کو فہ جو رانڈوں کا کارواں آيا

• Al Qisa Shab-e-Bistau Yakum jab huwee paidaa  القہک شب ِ بيست يکم جب ہوئي پيدا

• Akbar kay Kalaajay say jo Barchee Guzaar gayee   آکبر کے کليجے سے جو برچھي گزرگئي

• Jab Shae nay Qatal gah mai pai Pisaar ki lash   جب شہ نے قتل گاہ ميں پائي پسر کي لاش

• Shae nay jab chaand muharram ka safar may deakhaa  شہ نے جب چاند محرم کا سفر ميں ديکھا

• Aye mominoo taree mai poonchay jo shah-e-din  اے مومنوں ترائي ميں پھنچے جو شاہ ِ ديں

• Musafiran-e-Museebat wataan mai ataay hain  مسافران ِ مصيبت وطن ميں آتے ہيں

• Ravi nay yahee Likha hai paidaa huwee jo sham   راوي نے يہ لکھا ہے پيداہوئي جو شام

• Wataan say chuut kay koi khasataa jan shaheed na ho  وطن سے چھٹ کے کوئي خستہ جاں شہید نہ ہو

External links 
 Syed Ali Ausat Zaidi's Website
 Soazkhawani 
 Soza O Salam Collection
 About Ali Ausat Zaidi
 Ali Ausat Zaidi Majalis Collection
 Syed Ali Ausat Soz O Salam Collection
 Majlis Ad
 Syed Ali Ausat Zaidi Online Collection
 About Syed Ali Ausat Zaidi
 Ali Ausat Zaidi Soz O Salam Link
 Listen Online Collection of Syed Ali Ausat Zaidi
 Marsiya Clip at Google
 

People from Meerut
1932 births
2008 deaths
Muhajir people
Pakistani male poets
Urdu-language poets from Pakistan
Twelvers
Musicians from Karachi
Writers from Karachi
20th-century Pakistani poets
20th-century Pakistani male writers
20th-century Pakistani male singers
Pakistani Shia Muslims